is a railway station on the Sasaguri Line operated by JR Kyushu in Kasuya, Kasuya District, Fukuoka Prefecture, Japan.

Lines
The station is sometimes depicted on maps and timetables as part of the Fukuhoku Yutaka Line, of which the Sasaguri Line is a component.

Station layout 
The station consists of two side platforms serving two tracks. The original configuration had been an island platform serving two tracks but in late 2016, another side platform had been built on the other side of track 1 and platform 1 was moved across. The former platform 1 on the island was fenced off, leaving platform 2 using the former island as a side platform. The station building is a two-storey structure. The whole of the top level and part of the bottom level serves as designated parking areas for bicycles. A small waiting room and a staffed ticket window is located on the lower level. Platform 1 is directly access from the station building while platform 2 is access by means of a level crossing.

Management of the station has been outsourced to the JR Kyushu Tetsudou Eigyou Co., a wholly owned subsidiary of JR Kyushu specialising in station services. It staffs the ticket window which is equipped with a Midori no Madoguchi facility.

History
The station was opened by JR Kyushu on 13 March 1988 as an additional station on the existing track of the Sasaguri Line.

Passenger statistics
In fiscal 2016, the station was used by an average of 3,615 passengers daily (boarding passengers only), and it ranked 56th among the busiest stations of JR Kyushu.

References

External links
Yusu (JR Kyushu)

Railway stations in Japan opened in 1988
Railway stations in Fukuoka Prefecture
Stations of Kyushu Railway Company